A high king is a king who holds a position of seniority over a group of other kings, without the title of emperor. Similar titles include great king and king of kings. The high kings of history usually ruled over lands of cultural unity; thus high kings differentiate from emperors who control culturally different lands, and feudal monarchs, where subordinates assume lesser positions. High kings can be chosen by lesser rulers through elections, or be put into power by force through conquest of weaker kingdoms.

High kingship
In history and literature, high kings may be found where there is a high degree of cultural unity, along with sufficient political fragmentation that the high king's subordinates style themselves kings. In this respect, high kingships frequently differ from empires, which are culturally as well as politically heterogeneous, as well as from feudal monarchies, where the subordinate rulers take lesser titles (such as duke or count) and may be, at least in theory, subject to appointment and dismissal by the sovereign.

In this model, a high king might be chosen from among a group of kings in his personal capacity, for instance by election or on the basis of genealogical superiority. Alternatively, the high kingship might be attached to the kingship of one of the constituent kingdoms, either permanently or when one kingdom is able to assert supremacy over the others. The high king's authority over other kings is usually limited, and in some high 
kingships his duties are largely ceremonial or restricted to occasions such as war that create a need for a unified command structure.

Historical high kings
Rulers who have been termed "high king" (by their contemporaries or by modern observers) include:
Various rulers of the ancient and early medieval kingdoms in Great Britain and Ireland have been called "High King";
the High King of Ireland, such as Brian Boru.
the High King of Scotland, like the legendary Macbeth.
the King of the Britons, such as the legendary King Arthur, Uther Pendragon, and possibly Vortigern, have been termed "High King of Britain." 
the ruler of the Picts.
the "Bretwalda" was essentially the high king of the Anglo-Saxons, though the name is rarely translated as such.
some ancient Greek rulers, such as Agamemnon (see anax)
the most powerful king of the various Etruscan city-states
Mepe-Umaglesi (most high king) was a predicate of the Georgian Orthodox Mepe-Mepeta (king of kings)
in Lithuania, the title of Didysis Kunigaikštis is more accurately translated as "high king", although it is traditionally rendered as "grand duke"
in ancient Sumer, the rulers of all Sumer held the title of Nam-Lugal (high king).

In Imperial Germany, the German Emperor (Deutscher Kaiser), who was also the King of Prussia, could be considered a contemporary "high king", as he held seniority over the other monarchs of the empire (three kings, six grand dukes, five reigning dukes and seven reigning princes) as "president of the confederation".

The Yang di-Pertuan Agong (literally "supreme lord") in Malaysia could probably be seen as a "high king", as he is elected from among nine Malay rulers of the states (seven sultans, a raja, and a Yang di-Pertuan Besar-literally "great lord") by the Conference of Rulers (through informal agreement, on a rotational basis). In practice, however, the term "high king" is rarely applied to the Yang di-Pertuan Agong (king).

Adhiraja or Adiraja is the comparable term of high king in India. The maharaja could possibly be rendered as "high king", although the literal meaning is closer to "emperor".

Taewang, meaning "greatest of kings", was used by the later rulers of the Korean kingdom of Koguryo (and Silla, albeit to a rarer extent) to rank themselves as equals to the Chinese emperors or to express suzerainty over surrounding states, particularly during the Three Kingdoms Era. Daewang (great king) was used by rulers of other kingdoms and subsequent dynasties, including Baekje, whose king assumed the style of Daewang Pyeha ("his imperial majesty the great king") by the reign of King Mu (600-640 AD at the latest). However, after the Mongol Invasions of Korea, these rulers remained technically subordinate to the Mongol Empire and later China until King Gojong declared the Korean Empire in 1897 and assumed the title of Hwangje, or "emperor" (the Korean rendition of the Chinese "huang di").

It was later changed to become the Emperor of Japan.

The title "king of kings" also expresses much the same concept as "high king" – it was used at various times by the Emperor of Persia and the Emperor of Ethiopia. Similarly, the Imperial Mongolian title Khagan is sometimes translated as Khan of Khans.

In fiction 
 In C. S. Lewis's epic fantasy, The Chronicles of Narnia, Peter Pevensie was the High King of Narnia while his younger brother Edmund Pevensie was the King and his sisters Susan Pevensie and Lucy Pevensie were the Queens. He was also the high king over all kings of Narnia, from the first to the last. Aslan, the deity and the Great Lion of Narnia, is described as being "the High King above all High Kings", meaning he is the highest king over all rulers of Narnia.
 In J. R. R. Tolkien's works, mainly The Silmarillion, there was a succession of high kings of the Noldor exiled in Middle-earth, beginning with Fëanor and culminating in Gil-galad's reign. Ingwë, leader of the Vanyar, is also called the High King of the Eldar, while Manwë is also sometimes titled High King of Arda. Thingol is acknowledged as high-king of Beleriand by Fingolfin. In the Third Age, the rulers of Arnor were known as "high kings", including Aragorn, as King Elessar, ruling the reunited kingdoms of Gondor and Arnor at the beginning of the Fourth Age.
 In George R.R. Martin's A Song of Ice and Fire, the first human king ruling in Westeros was called the High King of the First Men.
 In Lloyd Alexander's Chronicles of Prydain, there is a line of High Kings of Prydain (a fictionalized version of Wales) who are descendants of a royal family who came from the Summer Country in order to oppose Arawn. The high king throughout the series is Gwydion's father Math, who is then succeeded by Gwydion and later Taran in the final novel of the series, The High King.
 In Bethesda Softworks' The Elder Scrolls, the high king is the highest authority in the Province of Skyrim and theoretically the high king of Alinor is also the highest authority of the Summerset Isle (later renamed Alinor).
 In Blizzard Entertainment's Warcraft, the high king is the leader of the Alliance who has military control over the Alliance forces.
In Holly Black's The Folk of the Air series, there is a high king who rules over the land of faeries, Elfhame.
  is also the name of a J-pop group created in 2008 featuring Ai Takahashi, Reina Tanaka, Saki Shimizu, Maimi Yajima and  Yuuka Maeda.

See also 

 Capo dei capi
 Paramount chief
 Primus inter pares

References

Heads of state
Royal titles
Noble titles
Titles of national or ethnic leadership